The Fontana Falcons were an American soccer team based in Fontana, California.

They joined the USISL in 1993 as the Montclair Standard Falcons from Montclair, California and moved to the USISL Premier League in 1995.

The club moved to Fontana in 1996, and folded after the season.

Year-by-year

Defunct soccer clubs in California
Fontana, California
Montclair, California
Sports in San Bernardino County, California
1993 establishments in California
1996 disestablishments in California
Association football clubs established in 1993
Association football clubs disestablished in 1996

References